The Palazzo Barberini is a 17th-century palace in Rome, facing the Piazza Barberini in Rione Trevi. Today, it houses the Galleria Nazionale d'Arte Antica, the main national collection of older paintings in Rome.

History
The sloping site had formerly been occupied by a garden-vineyard of the Sforza family, in which a palazzetto had been built in 1549. The sloping site passed from one cardinal to another during the sixteenth century, with no project fully getting off the ground. 

When Cardinal Alessandro Sforza met financial hardships, the still semi-urban site was purchased in 1625 by Maffeo Barberini, of the Barberini family, who became Pope Urban VIII. 

Three great architects worked to create the Palazzo, each contributing his own style and character to the building. Carlo Maderno, then at work extending the nave of St Peter's, was commissioned to enclose the Villa Sforza within a vast Renaissance block along the lines of Palazzo Farnese; however, the design quickly evolved into a precedent-setting combination of an urban seat of princely power combined with a garden front that had the nature of a suburban villa with a semi-enclosed garden.

Maderno began in 1627, assisted by his nephew Francesco Borromini. When Maderno died in 1629, Borromini was passed over and the commission was awarded to Bernini, a young prodigy then better known as a sculptor. Borromini stayed on regardless and the two architects worked together, albeit briefly, on this project and at the Palazzo Spada. Works were completed by Bernini in 1633.

After the Wars of Castro and the death of Urban VIII, the palace was confiscated by Pamphili Pope Innocent X and was only returned to the Barberini in 1653.

Architecture
The palazzo is disposed around a forecourt centered on Bernini's grand two-storey hall backed by an oval salone, with an extended wing dominating the piazza, which lies on a lower level. At the rear, a long wing protected the garden from the piazza below, above which it rose from a rusticated basement that was slightly battered like a military bastion. The main block presents three tiers of great arch-headed windows, like glazed arcades, a formula that was more Venetian than Roman. On the uppermost floor, Borromini's windows are set in a false perspective that suggests extra depth, a feature that has been copied into the 20th century. Flanking the hall, two sets of stairs lead to the piano nobile, a large squared staircase by Bernini to the left and a smaller oval staircase by Borromini to the right. 

As well as Borromini's false-perspective windows reveals, other influential aspects of Palazzo Barberini that were repeated throughout Europe include the unit of a central two-storey hall backed by an oval salone and the symmetrical wings that extended forward from the main block to create a cour d'honneur.

The garden is known as a giardino segreto ("secret garden"), for its concealment from an outsider's view. It houses a monument to Bertel Thorwaldsen, who had a studio in the nearby Teatro delle Quattro Fontane in 1822–1834.

Frescos
The salon ceiling is graced by  Pietro da Cortona's masterpiece, the Baroque fresco of the Allegory of Divine Providence and Barberini Power. This vast panegyric allegory became highly influential in guiding decoration for palatial and church ceilings; its influence can be seen in other panoramic scenes such as the frescoed ceilings at Sant'Ignazio (by Pozzo); or those at Villa Pisani at Stra, the throne room of the Royal Palace of Madrid, and the Ca' Rezzonico in Venice (by Tiepolo). Also in the palace is a masterpiece by Andrea Sacchi, a contemporary critic of the Cortona style, Divine Wisdom.

The rooms of the piano nobile have frescoed ceilings by other seventeenth-century artists like Giuseppe Passeri and Andrea Camassei, plus, in the museum collection, precious detached frescoes by Polidoro da Caravaggio and his lover Maturino da Firenze.

Modern history and attractions
Today, Palazzo Barberini houses the Galleria Nazionale d'Arte Antica, one of the most important painting collections in Italy. It includes Raphael's portrait La fornarina, Caravaggio's Judith Beheading Holofernes and a Hans Holbein portrait of Henry VIII. 

The palace also houses the Italian Institute of Numismatics.

The European Convention on Human Rights (ECHR), which created the European Court of Human Rights, was signed here on 4 November 1950, a milestone in the protection of human rights.

Hidden in the cellars of the rear part of the building, a Mithraeum was found during the construction work of Villa Savorgnan di Brazzà in 1936, dating probably from the second century AD.

References
Blunt, Anthony,  "The Palazzo Barberini", ''Journal of the Warburg and Courtauld Institutes 21 (1958).

External links
Palazzo Barberini: official site
Rome Art-Lover: Palazzo Barberini
Palazzo Barberini and Veneto Rome guide
Italian army ends museum stand-off, BBC News, Friday, 13 October 2006
Google Maps.  The complex constituting the Palazzo Barberini is in the center, set back from the road on all sides, and askew. On the lower side of the image are the start of the Quirinal Palace gardens. Below, and in the first corner on the right, is the San Carlo alle Quattro Fontane. Diagonally opposite and above is the triangular Piazza Barberini with the Triton Fountain.
The National Gallery of Ancient Art at Barberini Palace

Barberini
Barberini family
Baroque architecture in Rome
Gian Lorenzo Bernini buildings
Francesco Borromini buildings
Carlo Maderno buildings
Houses completed in 1633
Baroque palaces in Italy
Galleria Nazionale d'Arte Antica
Rome R. II Trevi
1633 establishments in the Papal States
1633 establishments in Italy